Juliet Jeanne d'Auvergne Campbell CMG (born 23 May 1935) is a retired British diplomat and academic administrator.

Through most of her career she was known as Juliet Collings.

Early life
Born in London, Campbell is the daughter of Major-General Wilfred d'Auvergne Collings (1893—1984) and his wife Harriet Nancy Draper Bishop, of Saint Peter Port, Guernsey, and was educated at the University of Oxford.

Career
In 1957, after Oxford, Campbell joined the Foreign Office. From 1961 to 1963 she was posted to the Common Market Delegation in Brussels, then returned to the Foreign Office for a year, before serving as a Second and later First Secretary at Bangkok until 1966. She was in the FO News Department, 1967–1970, then was Head of Chancery in the Hague, 1970–1974. After three years in the FO’s European Integration Department, she was posted as Counsellor (Information), to the British Embassy in Paris, 1977–1980. In 1981 she was seconded to the Royal College of Defence Studies, then was posted to Jakarta as a Counsellor, 1982–1983. After three years as Head of the Training Department at the FCO, 1984–1987, she served as British Ambassador to Luxembourg, 1988–1991, her final diplomatic appointment before she retired.

Campbell was appointed as Mistress of Girton College, Cambridge, in 1992, and the next year became Deputy Vice-Chancellor of the University.

Campbell retired from Girton College in 1998.

Personal life
In 1983, Juliet Collings married Professor Alexander Elmslie Campbell, a historian. He died in 2002.

Publication
 Wilfred d'Auvergne Collings, Juliet d'Auvergne Campbell, One Small Island and Two World Wars: The Life and Times of Major General Wilfred d'Auvergne Collings (Oxford: Rimes House, 2016)

Notes

1935 births
Living people
Alumni of Lady Margaret Hall, Oxford
Ambassadors of the United Kingdom to Luxembourg
Mistresses of Girton College, Cambridge
Companions of the Order of St Michael and St George
British women ambassadors